Vanessa Prager (born August 27, 1984) is a Los Angeles-based painter.

Career

Vanessa Prager is an American artist, born and raised in Los Angeles, California.

Known mainly for her large-scale, abstract oil paintings, Prager's main subject is the face. Perception, perspective and information flow are all central themes to her work, which became more widely recognized after her exhibition, Dreamers — a series of  "imagined" portraits which cross the border between the figurative and the abstract— opened and sold out completely, in Spring 2015.

In January 2016, Prager's first solo exhibition in NYC, Voyeur, opened, with favorable reviews. The Huffington Post described the works as "densely layered paintings, with pigment applied so thickly it forms its own topography", elaborating that, "various strokes of color – a ribbon of white like a squirt of toothpaste, a sharp sliver of green like a fish darting by – come together to form different visual narratives."

In 2015, W Magazine described Prager's paintings "sculptural" and that "nameless characters are barely visible up-close, but at distance they seem rise out of frantic ether like ghosts." In 2011 Prager painted still of Ryan Gosling, for the New York Times film Touch of Evil: Cinematic Villainy From the Year's Best Performers  by photographer and filmmaker Alex Prager.

Currently Vanessa Prager is represented by Richard Heller, Los Angeles and The Hole, NYC.

References

External links
Prager biography at VanessaPrager.com

1984 births
Living people
20th-century American artists
21st-century American artists
Artists from Los Angeles
20th-century American women artists
21st-century American women artists